Duzeh (also Romanized as Dūzeh; also known as Āb Dūzūyeh and Dūzeh-ye Vahmandeh) is a city and capital of Simakan District, Jahrom County, Fars Province, Iran.  At the 2006 census, its population was 790, in 178 families.

References

Populated places in Jahrom County
Jahrom County

Cities in Fars Province